John Long (born 12 April 1946) is a former  Australian rules footballer who played with South Melbourne in the Victorian Football League (VFL).

Notes

External links 

Living people
1946 births
Australian rules footballers from South Australia
Sydney Swans players
Glenelg Football Club players